Qi Yongkai (born 8 November 1998) is a Chinese Paralympic powerlifter. He won the gold medal in the men's 59 kg event at the 2020 Summer Paralympics held in Tokyo, Japan.

References

External links 
 

1998 births
Living people
Chinese powerlifters
Male powerlifters
Chinese male weightlifters
Paralympic powerlifters of China
Paralympic gold medalists for China
Paralympic medalists in powerlifting
Powerlifters at the 2020 Summer Paralympics
Medalists at the 2020 Summer Paralympics
Place of birth missing (living people)
21st-century Chinese people